Stavne is a neighbourhood in the city of Trondheim in Trøndelag county, Norway.  It is located in the borough of Midtbyen.  It is located on the west shore of the river Nidelva, east of Byåsen. It lies across the river from Elgeseter. The area was previously served the Dovre Line. It is presently served by the Stavne–Leangen Line which runs between Stavne and Leangen.

Stavne is the location of Trondheim (Stavne) Cemetery which is maintained by the Commonwealth War Graves Commission.

References

Geography of Trondheim
Neighbourhoods of Trondheim